The 1973 Michigan Wolverines football team represented the University of Michigan in the 1973 Big Ten Conference football season. In his fifth year as Michigan's head coach, Bo Schembechler led the team to a 10–0–1 record.  It was Michigan's first undefeated season since 1948.  The Wolverines outscored their opponents 330 to 68.  Michigan was ranked No. 6 in both of the major post-season polls.  Two other selectors, the National Championship Foundation and the Poling System, recognize Michigan as a co-national champion for the 1973 season.

The season ended with a 10–10 tie against Ohio State.  Both teams were undefeated, with the winner to play the Rose Bowl.  When the game ended in a tie, the Big Ten Conference athletic directors voted to send Ohio State to the Rose Bowl.  Michigan athletic officials and fans were outraged, with even the Vice President of the United States speaking out against the decision.

On offense, the team was led by quarterback Dennis Franklin who completed 36 of 67 passes for 534 yards and rushed 101 times for 425 yards.  Four Michigan running backs, Ed Shuttlesworth, Chuck Heater, Gil Chapman, and Gordon Bell, combined for 2,417 rushing yards.  Shuttlesworth, Franklin, wing back Clint Haslerig, and offensive guard Mike Hoban were all selected as All-Big Ten Conference players. Tight end Paul Seal was selected for the team's Most Valuable Player award.

On defense, the Wolverines held opponents to 68 points, an average of 6.2 points per game.  Defensive tackle Dave Gallagher and defensive back Dave Brown were both selected as consensus first-team All-Americans.  Middle linebacker Steve Strinko led the team with 77 solo tackles and 108 total tackles.

Schedule

Season summary

Pre-season
The 1972 Michigan team had compiled a 10–1 record and were ranked sixth in the final Coaches and AP Polls.  Important players from the 1972 team who were lost to graduation included offensive guard Tom Coyle, center Bill Hart, tight end Paul Seymour, defensive tackle Fred Grambau, and defensive back Randy Logan. Important players returning to the 1973 team included quarterback Dennis Franklin, fullback Ed Shuttlesworth, tailback Chuck Heater, tight end Paul Seal, wing back Clint Haslerig, defensive back Dave Brown, defensive tackle Dave Gallagher, and defensive end Don Coleman.

In April 1973, Michigan's recruiting class for the incoming class of 1973 was finalized.  The class of 24 recruits included running back Rob Lytle and wide receiver Jim Smith. Also in April, Michigan held its annual spring football game matching the "blue" and "white" squads against each other.  Sophomore running back Gordon Bell reportedly "sparkled" with 75 rushing yards on 12 carries.

Before the start of the season, head coach Bo Schembechler told the media that he was "very, very high" on Dennis Franklin and that he planned on using a "balanced attack" with two-thirds running plays and one-third passing.

Schembechler also stated that he took special pride in the 30 seniors on his 1973 team.  Schembechler had recruited the senior class after suffering a heart attack following the 1969 season. He recalled, "My assistant coaches would bring them to my house. I'd get out of bed and put on a coat and tie. Then after they left I'd go back to bed, but I wanted to talk to them myself. I wanted them to know that Bo Schembechler was going to coach them if they came to Michigan."

In the pre-season polls, Michigan was ranked No. 5 by the Associated Press (AP) and No. 6 by the United Press International (UPI) with Ohio State No. 2 in the AP and No. 3 in the UPI poll. USC was ranked No. 1 in both polls.  Former Michigan State coach Duffy Daugherty predicted Michigan, based on its strong offensive and defensive backfields, would win the Big Ten Conference championship.

at Iowa

    
    
    
    
    
    

On September 15, 1973, Michigan opened its season with a 31–7 victory over Iowa in front of a crowd of 52,105 at Kinnick Stadium in Iowa City.  The Wolverines rushed for 440 yards against the Hawkeyes, led by tailback Chuck Heater (133 yards and a touchdown), fullback Ed Shuttlesworth (88 yards), Gil Chapman (69 yards and a touchdown), quarterback Dennis Franklin (62 yards and a touchdown), and Gordon Bell (50 yards). Franklin completed only two of eight passes for 26 yards and threw two interceptions. In the second quarter, Iowa's Earl Douthitt returned an interception 47 yards for Iowa's only touchdown. Mike Lantry also kicked a 39-yard field goal and converted all four extra point attempts. Linebacker Steve Strinko led Michigan with 10 tackles and three assists.

Stanford

    
    
    
    
    
    
    
    
    
    

On September 22, 1973, Michigan defeated Stanford, 47–10, in front of a crowd of 80,177 at Michigan Stadium.  Michigan took a 21–0 lead in the first quarter and led 34–0 at halftime. Dennis Franklin rushed for 49 yards and completed five of eight passes for 50 yards, including a four-yard touchdown pass in the second quarter. Mike Lantry broke Dana Coin's Michigan record with a 50-yard field goal in the second quarter; Lantry then broke his own record later in the quarter with a 51-yard field goal. The game was billed as revenge for Stanford's defeat of No. 3-ranked Michigan in the 1972 Rose Bowl. Chuck Heater scored Michigan's first touchdown, while Ed Shuttlesworth and Gil Chapman each scored two touchdowns. The Wolverines sacked Stanford quarterbacks Mike Boryla and Mike Cordova 11 times in the game. Stanford's only touchdown came on a 19-yard pass from Boryla to Reggie Ishman in the fourth quarter.

Navy

    
    

On September 29, 1973, Michigan defeated Navy, 14-0, in front of a Band Day crowd of 88,042 at Michigan Stadium. Michigan's two touchdowns were scored by Chuck Heater on an eight-yard run in the first quarter and Ed Shuttlesworth on a one-yard run in the third quarter. Navy completed 17 of 30 passes for 173 yards and three interceptions, with a touchdown pass being deflected at the last second by Dave Brown. Navy out-gained Michigan with 320 yard of total offense to 285 for Michigan.  Michigan completed only one pass for four yards on three attempts. After the game, Michigan coach Bo Schembechler complained that he "didn't see us block anybody", that his team "played the worst game I've ever coached in Michigan Stadium", and added, "I hope this is a humbling victory . . . if there is such a thing."  Despite the shutout, Schembechler also ripped his defensive unit, complaining that they did not play pass defense and played "the worst game our defense has ever played in shutting anybody out."

Oregon

    
    
    
    

On October 6, 1973, Michigan defeated Oregon, 24–0, in front of a crowd of 81,113 at Michigan Stadium.  With Dennis Franklin out of action due to a broken finger, Larry Cipa made his first career start at quarterback for Michigan. Michigan scored 14 points in the second quarter on a short run by Bob Thornbladh and a short pass from Cipa to Paul Seal. In the fourth quarter, Michigan padded its lead on an 83-yard punt return by Gil Chapman and a Mike Lantry field goal. Michigan totaled 183 rushing yards and 93 passing yards against the Ducks. Despite the 24-point margin of victory, the press viewed Michigan's performance as sluggish.  Joe Falls, sports editor of the Detroit Free Press, wrote of the team: "It is sluggish on offense. It is making mistakes all over the place . . . This Michigan team isn't close to being the error-free Michigan teams we have come to know so well over these last four years."

at Michigan State
   
 
    
    
    
    

On October 13, 1973, Michigan defeated Michigan State, 31–0, in a soaking rainstorm before a crowd of 78,263 at Spartan Stadium. It was the Wolverines' third consecutive shutout and their most one-sided victory over the Spartans since 1947. With the ball slippery due to the rain, Michigan recovered four Michigan State fumbles in the first quarter.  Dave Brown scored Michigan's first touchdown on a 52-yard punt return. Gil Chapman scored on a 53-yard run around left end in the second quarter, and Michigan led 17–0 at halftime. In the third quarter, neither team scored as the rain became a "deluge". Michigan added two more touchdowns in the fourth quarter on a six-yard pass from Dennis Franklin to Paul Seal and a two-yard run by Ed Shuttlesworth.  Mike Lantry kicked a 35-yard field goal and converted all four extra point attempts. Dennis Franklin played with a broken finger, leading coach Schembechler to praise his one-handed quarterback for "a helluva job." On defense, the Wolverines held the Spartans to 40 rushing yards on 37 carries.  Linebacker Steve Strinko had nine tackles, four of them for a loss, and recovered a fumble.

Wisconsin

    
    
    
    
    
    

On October 20, 1973, Michigan defeated Wisconsin, 35–6, in front of a homecoming crowd of 87,723 at Michigan Stadium.  With 108 passing yards and 415 rushing yards, the Wolverines tallied 523 yards of total offense. Michigan opened the scoring in the first quarter with a 46-yard touchdown pass from Dennis Franklin to Paul Seal.  Michigan's remaining touchdowns were scored by Gil Chapman (three-yard run in second quarter), Franklin (one-yard run in second quarter), Chuck Heater (four-yard run in third quarter), and Gordon Bell (seven-yard run in fourth quarter). Mike Lantry converted all five extra point attempts. Michigan's shutout streak ended after 15 consecutive quarters when Wisconsin scored on a freak play as a deflected pass resulted  in a 65-yard touchdown in the fourth quarter.

at Minnesota
   
 
    
    
    
    
    
    

On October 27, 1973, Michigan defeated Minnesota, 34–7, before a homecoming crowd of 44,435 at Memorial Stadium in Minneapolis. The victory was Michigan's sixth in a row in the annual battle for the Little Brown Jug. Michigan rushed for 275 yards led by Gordon Bell with 73 yards and Ed Shuttlesworth with 69 yards. Shuttlesworth and Bell scored two rushing touchdowns each, and Mike Lantry kicked field goals of 27 and 29 yards and converted all four extra point kicks. Michigan took a 17–0 lead in the first quarter, including 10 points off early turnovers.  On the second play from scrimmage, a Minnesota fumble was recovered by Michigan (Doug Troszak) to set up Lantry's first field goal.  On Minnesota's next play from scrimmage, the Gophers fumbled again with Dave Brown recovering to set up a six-yard touchdown run by Shuttlesworth. After Bell scored in the second quarter, Michigan led 24–0 at halftime without having thrown a single pass. In the third quarter, Minnesota quarterback Rick Upchurch (later an All-Pro wide receiver for the Denver Broncos) threw a touchdown pass to a wide open Vince Fuller. Minnesota coach Cal Stoll played eight men on the line, but Michigan's defense held Minnesota to 142 yards of total offense.

Indiana

    
    
    
    
    
    
    
    
    

On November 3, 1973, Michigan defeated Indiana, 49–13, in front of 76,432 at Michigan Stadium. Michigan took a 42–0 lead in the second quarter before Indiana scored its first touchdown The Wolverines totaled 385 rushing yards and 96 passing yards. Chuck Heater was the game's leading rusher with 128 yards.  After the game, Indiana coach Lee Corso praised both Michigan and Ohio State and predicted that the showdown between the two would be decided by a kicking mistake in the fourth quarter.

Illinois

    
    
    
    
    

On November 10, 1973, Michigan defeated Illinois, 21–6, in front of 76,461 at Michigan Stadium. Late in the first quarter, Michigan moved the ball to near midfield on a 25-yard run by Chuck Heater when an Irish setter ran onto the field and delayed the game for several minutes. After the game, Bo Schembechler joked, "When you're on offense, everything is momentum. We're standing in the huddle watching that dog and there goes our momentum." Neither team scored in the first quarter, but Illinois took a 6–0 lead in the second quarter on two field goals by Dan Beaver, the second of which bounced off the left upright down onto the crossbar before falling across. Michigan took the lead late in the second quarter on a one-yard touchdown run by Ed Shuttlesworth. Michigan led, 7–6, at halftime.

On the opening drive of the second half, Gil Chapman scored on a 33-yard touchdown run off an option pitch from Dennis Franklin. In the fourth quarter, an option pitch by Franklin was deflected by Illinois.  In the resulting scramble for the loose ball, Paul Seal recovered and ran 20 yards for a touchdown with Mike Hoban knocking over three Illini with a block to clear Seal's path.  Mike Lantry converted all three extra point kicks for Michigan. In uncharacteristic form, the Wolverines fumbled six times in the game, resulting in four turnovers. After the game, coach Schembechler promised that he'd run the next guy who fumbled "til his tongue hangs out." Michigan's defense held the Illini to 52 yards of total offense in the second half.

at Purdue

   
 
    
    
    
    
    
    

On November 17, 1973, Michigan defeated Purdue, 34–9, before a crowd of 56,485 at Ross–Ade Stadium in West Lafayette, Indiana. In a low-scoring first half, Michigan took the lead in the second quarter on a 41-yard touchdown pass from Dennis Franklin to Clint Haslerig, but Mike Lantry missed the extra point kick after the snap from center was bobbled.  Purdue kicked a 27-yard field goal later in the quarter, and Michigan led 6–3 at halftime. In the second half, Michigan's running game dominated as Franklin scored on touchdown runs of three and 12 yards in the third quarter, Bob Thornbladh scored on a pair of touchdown runs in the fourth quarter. Lantry converted all four extra point kicks in the second half. Michigan rushed for 310 yards in the game, including 84 yards by Chuck Heater, 66 yards by Ed Shuttlesworth, 64 yards for Gordon Bell, and 57 yards for Franklin. Franklin also completed three of seven passes for 70 yards. Purdue scored late in third quarter on an 18-yard pass from Bo Bobrowski to Herrick. Michigan's defense held Purdue to 119 yards (100 rushing and 19 passing).

On the same afternoon, Ohio State defeated Iowa, 55–13, as Archie Griffin broke the Buckeyes' single game record with 246 rushing yards.  The victories by Michigan and Ohio State left both teams undefeated with the winner of the following week's rivalry match advancing to the Rose Bowl.

Ohio State

    
    
    
    

On November 24, 1973, #4 Michigan and #1 Ohio State played to a 10–10 tie before a crowd of 105,223 at Michigan Stadium. Ohio State scored 10 points in the second quarter on a 31-yard field goal by Blair Conway and a five-yard touchdown run by fullback Pete Johnson.  Michigan scored 10 point in the fourth quarter on a 30-yard field goal by Mike Lantry and a 10-yard touchdown run by Dennis Franklin. Franklin sustained a broken collarbone late in the fourth quarter.  Michigan had 303 yards of total offense (204 rushing, 99 passing) to 234 yards (234 rushing and zero passing) for Ohio State. Archie Griffin rushed for 163 of Ohio State's 234 yards of total offense. Ed Shuttlesworth rushed for 116 yards for Michigan.

Rose Bowl controversy
With the Michigan–Ohio State game ending in a tie, Michigan and Ohio State tied for the Big Ten Conference championship with Michigan at 10–0–1 and Ohio State at 9–0–1.  Under a conference rule, the conference's berth to the 1974 Rose Bowl was decided by a vote of the conference's athletic directors.  Ohio State won the vote with six of ten athletic directors voting to send the Buckeyes to Pasadena. The injury to Michigan's starting quarterback Dennis Franklin was reported to be a significant factor in the vote of several athletic directors.  The vote spawned a controversy, including public comments by the following:

 Coach Schemechler blamed conference commissioner Wayne Duke for engineering the vote and vowed, "I'm not going to let this drop.  I'm going to get him." On being told that Duke had opened an investigation into Schembechler's alleged unsportsmanlike conduct which could result in the conference stripping Michigan of bowl privileges, Schembechler joked, "They already did that . . . that'd be double jeopardy."
 Former Michigan football player Gerald Ford, in one of his first public comments after taking office as Vice President of the United States (Ford was sworn in on December 6, 1973), criticized the Big Ten's decision saying, "On the basis of that game with Ohio State, Michigan should have gone. Look at the statistics. Michigan was the better team in that game.  Michigan won the first, third and fourth quarters and Ohio State won the second.  Look at the records, Michigan won 10 games and Ohio State won nine and each had a tie."
 A lawsuit was filed in federal court by a University of Michigan graduate student seeking an injunction requiring the Big Ten to conduct a new, public vote on which team should participate in the Rose Bowl. The University of Michigan refused to join the suit, and its athletic director Don Canham called the suit "ridiculous", while its  faculty representative Marcus Plant called it "frivolous". The federal judge assigned to the case denied the plaintiff's request for an injunction.
 In Washington, D.C., Congressman Marvin Esch told the House of Representatives he wanted "a full explanation as to the method of selection."
 Michigan State athletic director Burt Smith, who reportedly cast the deciding vote for Ohio State, drew angry comments from Michigan legislators. Representative Loren Anderson announced that the legislature might respond by denying Michigan State University's application for a new law school. Other legislators said "the appropriations committee ought to scrutinize MSU's budget request a little closer next time around." A Michigan State spokesman stated that Smith had voted for the team with the best chance of winning the [Rose Bowl] game," and Smith himself stated that "no team dominated Michigan State the way Ohio State did." On January 1, 1974, Ohio State beat USC, 42-21. (In fact, Michigan State did not get a law school until nearly a quarter of a century later when the Detroit College of Law became the Michigan State University College of Law).

Post-season
Michigan's undefeated season in 1973 was its first since 1948.

At the end of the season, Paul Seal was voted as the recipient of the team's most valuable player award, then known as the Louis B. Hyde Memorial Award. At six feet, six inches, Seal caught only 14 passes for 253 yards, but he was described by Michigan coaches as "the best blocking tight end ever to wear the maize and blue."

Four Michigan players received recognition on the 1973 College Football All-America Team.  They were:
 Defensive tackle Dave Gallagher was recognized as a consensus All-American, receiving first-team honors from the Associated Press (AP), the American Football Coaches Association (AFCA), the Football Writers Association of America (FWAA), the Newspaper Enterprise Association, the Walter Camp Football Foundation, The Sporting News, and Time magazine.
 Defensive back Dave Brown was also recognized as a consensus All-American, receiving first-team honors from the AFCA, FWAA, and the United Press International (UPI).
 Mike Lantry was selected by Football News as a first-team All-American as "the nation's top placekicker".
 Paul Seal was selected by the UPI as the second-team tight end on its All-America team.

Fifteen Michigan players received honors from either the AP or UPI on their 1973 All-Big Ten Conference football teams.  They Michigan honorees were: Dave Brown (AP-1, UPI-1), Dennis Franklin (AP-1, UPI-1), Dave Gallagher (AP-1, UPI-1), Mike Hoban (AP-1, UPI-1), Ed Shuttlesworth (AP-1, UPI-1), Clint Haslerig (UPI-1), Jim Coode (AP-2, UPI-2), Paul Seal (AP-2, UPI-2), Gil Chapman (UPI-2), Don Coleman (UPI-2), Gary Hainrihar (UPI-2), Chuck Heater (AP-2), Steve Strinko (AP-2), Donald R. Warner (UPI-2), Walt Williamson (AP-2)

Two days after the Ohio State game, Michigan assistant coach Frank Maloney was hired as the head coach at Syracuse. Tom Reed, who had played for Schembechler at Miami (Ohio), was hired to replace Maloney.

On January 3, 1974, the final AP Poll rankings were announced. Notre Dame took the No. 1 spot, edging Ohio State, which had dropped out of the No. 1 spot after playing to a tie against Michigan. Michigan, which sat idle despite its undefeated record, dropped from the No. 5 spot to No. 6 spot, as Penn State rose to No. 5 after defeating LSU in the Orange Bowl. Two other selectors, the National Championship Foundation and the Poling System, recognize Michigan as a co-national champion for the 1973 season.

On January 6, 1974, Schembechler coached the East team to a 24–14 win in the Hula Bowl.  Ed Shuttlesworth rushed for 88 yards on 22 carries for the East squad.

In the 1973 NFL Draft, held on January 29 and 30, 1974, the following Michigan players were selected.

Players

Offensive letter winners
The following players won varsity letters for their participation on the team's offensive unit. Players who were starters in at least half of the team's games, or who started the most games at a position, are shown with their names in bold.

 James Armour, offensive guard, senior, Detroit, Michigan
 Gordon Bell, tailback, sophomore, Troy, Ohio
 Jon Cederberg, tailback, senior, Plymouth, Michigan
 Gil Chapman, wing back, junior, Elizabeth, New Jersey – started 3 games at tailback
 John A. Cherry, offensive tackle, senior, Willard, Ohio
 Larry Cipa, quarterback, senior, Cincinnati, Ohio – started 1 game at quarterback
 Jim Coode, offensive tackle, junior, Mayfield Heights, Ohio – started 9 games at right tackle
 James C. Czirr, center, sophomore, St. Joseph, Michigan – started 2 games at center
 Greg DenBoer, tight end, junior, Kentwood, Michigan
 Arthur W. Fediuk, tight end, senior, Livonia, Michigan
 Dennis Franklin, quarterback, junior, Massillon, Ohio – started 10 games at quarterback
 Dennis Franks, center, junior, Bethel Park, Pennsylvania – started 5 games at center
 Larry Gustafson, wing back, senior, Mays Landing, New Jersey
 Gary Hainrihar, offensive guard, senior, Cicero, Illinois – started 3 games at right guard, 2 games at left guard
 Clint Haslerig, wing back, senior, Cincinnati, Ohio – started all 11 games at wing back
 Chuck Heater, tailback, junior, Tiffin, Ohio – started 8 games at tailback
 Bill Hoban, offensive tackle, senior, Chicago, Illinois – started 7 games at left guard
 Mike Hoban, offensive guard, junior, Chicago, Illinois
 Thomas P. Jensen, center, junior, Springfield, Illinois – started 4 games at center
 Keith Johnson, split end, sophomore, Munster, Indiana
 Larry L. Johnson, defensive end, senior, Munster, Indiana – started all 11 games at split end
 R. Steven King, offensive tackle, junior, Tiffin, Ohio
 Mike Lantry, place-kicker, junior, Oxford, Michigan
 Kirk Lewis, offensive tackle, sophomore, Garden City, Michigan – started 2 games at right guard, 1 game at left guard
 David F. Metz, offensive guard, junior, Harrison, Ohio – started 6 games at right guard, 1 game at left guard
 George Przygodski, tight end, sophomore, Grand Rapids, Michigan
 Paul Seal, tight end, senior, Detroit, Michigan – started all 11 games at tight end
 Ed Shuttlesworth, fullback, senior, Cincinnati, Ohio – started all 11 games at fullback 
 Tom Slade, quarterback, senior, Saginaw, Michigan 
 Jim Smith, end, freshman, Blue Island, Illinois 
 Ronald Szydlowski, wing back, senior, Wyandotte, Michigan
 John E. Thomas, center, senior, Detroit, Michigan
 Bob Thornbladh, fullback, senior, Plymouth, Michigan
 Douglas Troszak, offensive tackle, senior, Warren, Michigan 
 Curtis Tucker, offensive tackle, senior, Cleveland, Ohio – started all 11 games at left tackle
 Pat Tumpane, offensive tackle, junior, Midlothian, Illinois – started 2 games at right tackle

Defensive letter winners
The following players won varsity letters for their participation on the team's defensive unit. Players who were starters in at least half of the team's games are shown with their names in bold.

Dave Brandon, defensive end, senior, Plymouth, Michigan
 Dave Brown, safety, junior, Akron, Ohio – started all 11 games at safety
Roy W. Burks, defensive back, junior, Midland, Michigan 
 Don Coleman, defensive end, senior, Daly City, Ohio – started all 11 games at right defensive end
 Tim Davis, middle guard, sophomore, Warren, Ohio – started 7 games at middle guard
 Michael J. Day, linebacker, senior, Livonia, Michigan
 Barry Dotzauer, defensive back, senior, Cincinnati, Ohio – started 10 games at weak-side defensive halfback
 Thomas E. Drake, defensive back, junior, Midland, Michigan – started 1 game at weak-side defensive halfback
 Don Dufek, wolfman, sophomore, East Grand Rapids, Michigan – started all 11 games at wolfman
 Donald R. Eaton, defensive end, senior, Lancaster, Ohio
 Dave Elliott, defensive back, junior, Coral Gables, Florida – started all 11 games at strong-side defensive halfback
 Dave Gallagher, defensive tackle, senior, Piqua, Ohio – started all 11 games at right defensive tackle
 Dan Jilek, defensive end, sophomore, Sterling Heights, Michigan
 Gregory Koss, safety, senior, Cuyahoga Falls, Ohio
 James M. Lyall, defensive tackle, senior, North Olmstead, Ohio
 Craig A. Mutch, linebacker, senior, Detroit
 Jeff Perlinger, offensive tackle, junior, Crystal, Minnesota – started 1 game at left defensive tackle
 Carl Russ, linebacker, sophomore, Muskegon Heights, Michigan – started all 11 games at w. linebacker
 Geoffrey Steger, wolf, junior, Winnetka, Illinois 
 Steve Strinko, linebacker, sophomore, Middletown, Ohio – started all 11 games at middle linebacker
 Douglas Troszak, defensive tackle, senior, Warren, Michigan – started 10 games at defensive left tackle
 Jovan Vercel, linebacker, senior, Highland, Indiana
 Donald R. Warner, middle guard, senior, Dearborn, Michigan – started 4 games at middle guard
 Walter Williamson, defensive end, senior, Detroit, Michigan – started all 11 games at left defensive end

Other players
The following players did not win varsity letters, but participated as backups or as members of the junior varsity (JV) or all freshman (AF) teams. 
 Harry Banks, tailback, senior, Cleveland, Ohio 
 Jim Bolden, tailback, freshman (JV), Akron, Ohio
 Kevin Casey, quarterback, senior, Grand Rapids, Michigan 
 Jim Hackett, linebacker, freshman (JV), London, Ohio
 Rob Lytle, tailback (JV), freshman, Fremont, Ohio
 Les Miles, offensive guard, sophomore, Elyria, Ohio
 Calvin O'Neal, linebacker, sophomore, Saginaw, Michigan

Awards and honors
 All-Americans: Dave Brown (consensus), Dave Gallagher (consensus), Mike Lantry (Football News), Paul Seal (UPI-2)
 All-Conference: Dave Brown (AP-1, UPI-1), Dennis Franklin (AP-1, UPI-1), Dave Gallagher (AP-1, UPI-1), Mike Hoban (AP-1, UPI-1), Ed Shuttlesworth (AP-1, UPI-1), Clint Haslerig (UPI-1), Jim Coode (AP-2, UPI-2), Paul Seal (AP-2, UPI-2), Gil Chapman (UPI-2), Don Coleman (UPI-2), Gary Hainrihar (UPI-2), Chuck Heater (AP-2), Steve Strinko (AP-2), Donald R. Warner (UPI-2), Walt Williamson (AP-2)
 Most Valuable Player: Paul Seal
 Meyer Morton Award: Paul Seal
 John Maulbetsch Award: Don Dufek
 Frederick Matthei Award: Dave Brown
 Arthur Robinson Scholarship Award: Don Warner

Statistical leaders
The following players were Michigan's statistical leaders for the 1973 season.

Rushing

Passing

Receiving

Kickoff returns

Punt returns

Tackles

Coaching staff
Head coach: Bo Schembechler
Assistant coaches: Dennis Brown, Tirrel Burton, Jerry Hanlon, Jack Harbaugh, Frank Maloney, George Mans, Gary Moeller, Chuck Stobart, Elliot Uzelac
Trainer: Lindsy McLean
Manager: James T. Bueter

References

External links
  1973 Football Team -- Bentley Historical Library, University of Michigan Athletics History

Michigan
Michigan Wolverines football seasons
Big Ten Conference football champion seasons
College football undefeated seasons
Michigan Wolverines football